Knee effusion, informally known as water on the knee, occurs when excess synovial fluid accumulates in or around the knee joint. It has many common causes, including arthritis, injury to the ligaments or meniscus, or fluid collecting in the bursa, a condition known as prepatellar bursitis.

Signs and symptoms
Signs and symptoms of water on the knee depend on the cause of excess synovial fluid build-up in the knee joint. These may include:

Pain
Osteoarthritis knee pain usually occurs while the joint is bearing weight, so the pain typically subsides with rest; some patients experience severe pain, while others report no discomfort. Even if one knee is much larger than the other, pain is not guaranteed.

Swelling
One knee may appear larger than the other. Puffiness around the bony parts of the knee appear prominent when compared with the other knee.

Stiffness
When the knee joint contains excess fluid, it may become difficult or painful to bend or straighten. Fluid may also show under the knee when straightened. Icing may help to decrease swelling. Heat may help relax the muscles of the knee.

Bruising
If an individual has injured their knee, they may note bruising on the front, sides or rear of the knee. Bearing weight on the knee joint may be impossible and the pain unbearable. Bruising may be seen as bluish lesion.

Causes
Causes of the swelling can include arthritis, injury to the ligaments of the knee, or an accident after which the body's natural reaction is to surround the knee with a protective fluid. There could also be an underlying disease or condition. The type of fluid that accumulates around the knee depends on the underlying disease, condition or type of traumatic injury that caused the excess fluid. The swelling can, in most cases, be easily cured.

Underlying diseases may include     
 Knee osteoarthritis
 Rheumatoid arthritis
 Infection
 Gout
 Pseudogout
 Prepatellar bursitis (kneecap bursitis)
 Cysts
 Tumours
 Repetitive strain injury

Having osteoarthritis or engaging in high-risk sports that involve rapid cut-and-run movements of the knee — football or tennis, for example — means an individual is more likely to develop water on the knee.

In overweight or obese individuals the body places more weight on the knee joint. This causes more wear in the joint. Over time, the body may produce excess joint fluid.

Diagnosis

Diagnostic tests include:

Joint aspiration
Also known as arthrocentesis, this procedure includes withdrawal of fluid from inside the knee for analysis such as cell count, culture for bacteria, and examination for crystals, such as uric acid or calcium pyrophosphate dihydrate ram crystals found in gout or pseudogout.

Imaging

An X-ray is useful to verify that there is no break or dislocation when there is a history of trauma. May show signs of osteoarthritis.

MRI
Magnetic Resonance Imaging detects abnormalities of the bone or knee joint, such as a tear in the ligaments, tendons or cartilage.

Blood tests
If the knee is swollen and red and warm to the touch when compared to the other knee, a doctor may be concerned about inflammation due to rheumatoid arthritis or a crystalline arthritis, such as gout or pseudogout, or joint infection. Besides sending the joint fluid to a laboratory for analysis, blood tests may requested to determine a white blood cell count, erythrocyte sedimentation rate, and perhaps the level of C-reactive protein or uric acid. If blood tests reveal Lyme disease antibodies forming, the condition may be attributed to it.

Treatment
Treatment of fluid in the knee depends on the underlying cause of the swelling. General measures such as rest, ice, and analgesics such as acetaminophen (paracetamol) and NSAIDS are often recommended. Chymotrypsin, trypsin and Diclofenac are also recommended.

References

Mayo Clinic - Water on the Knee

External links

Musculoskeletal disorders
Effusion